Sandy Ridge is an unincorporated community located within Delaware Township in Hunterdon County, New Jersey, United States. As its name implies, the community is located at the top of a small hill that is sandwiched between the Hunterdon Plateau and the Sourland Mountains. Sandy Ridge Road is the main road east and west through the community while County Route 605 is a minor arterial road that passes north and south through the area. The area consists of mainly residences with some farmland and forestland. The Sandy Ridge Church (with adjacent cemetery) is a Baptist church founded in 1818 with its current building constructed in 1866 and is located in the center of Sandy Ridge.

References

Delaware Township, Hunterdon County, New Jersey
Unincorporated communities in Hunterdon County, New Jersey
Unincorporated communities in New Jersey